David Livermore (born 20 May 1980) is an English retired footballer who is currently the assistant manager of Gillingham. Livermore has featured for clubs such as Arsenal, Millwall, Hull City, Brighton & Hove Albion, Luton Town and Oldham Athletic. He also served as a player/manager at Histon.

Playing career
Born in Edmonton, London, Livermore was a trainee at Arsenal and went on to feature for Millwall, where he became club captain. With Millwall, he won the 2001 Division Two title. While at the club he also played in the 2004 FA Cup Final, but he conceded a penalty as they lost to Manchester United. He as well netted the 1000th goal of the Coca-Cola £1 million goal chase against Nottingham Forest. In 2006, LIvermore won Millwall's Player of the Year award.

Livermore joined Hull City for £500,000, having been spent only ten days as a Leeds United player after signing from Millwall in the summer of 2006 also for £500,000. This came after Leeds manager Kevin Blackwell stated the club had eventually managed to acquire other players in the same position in Ian Westlake and Kevin Nicholls, and felt Livermore's first team chances were limited.
Livermore missed Hull's first two matches in the 2006–07 season through injury, but went on to play in twenty-five league games, scoring four goals and aiding Hull in escaping relegation. He joined Oldham Athletic on loan on 31 January 2008.
 With the Latics he played 10 games and scored once altogether.

On 5 June 2008, Hull announced that Livermore would be leaving the club that summer, following their promotion to the Premier League.

On 3 July 2008, it was announced that Livermore had agreed a two-year contract at League One club Brighton & Hove Albion. On 26 March 2009, Livermore was allowed to leave Brighton to join League Two side Luton Town on loan, where he made eight appearances. On 2 February 2010, it was revealed that Livermore was due to leave Brighton, although his current contract wouldn't expire until the end of the season.

On 4 February 2010 he signed with Barnet, scoring once in 14 appearances, against Darlington. After a change of manager two games before the end of the 2009–10 season, he was released by Barnet.

Managerial career
Livermore was appointed manager of Conference National team Histon on 23 August 2010. Livermore featured 14 times during the 2010–11 season, after which Histon were relegated to the Conference North; he was a more regular fixture for the club in the 2011–12 season with 30 starts and one substitute appearance, as they finished the season in 16th place.
In 2012, Livermore was recruited as a youth team coach at Millwall and in 2015, was appointed as the assistant manager of the club.

On 3 October 2019, Livermore resigned as assistant manager of Millwall

On 31 January 2022, Livermore again followed Neil Harris as his assistant manager to League One strugglers Gillingham.

Style of play
His preferred position is central midfield, but he can also play in defence, either in the centre or at left-back.

Honours

Club
Millwall
Football League Division Two: 2000–01
FA Cup runner-up: 2003–04

Individual
Millwall Player of the Season: 2005–06

References

External links

1980 births
Living people
Footballers from Edmonton, London
English footballers
Association football defenders
Association football midfielders
Association football utility players
Arsenal F.C. players
Millwall F.C. players
Leeds United F.C. players
Hull City A.F.C. players
Oldham Athletic A.F.C. players
Brighton & Hove Albion F.C. players
Luton Town F.C. players
Barnet F.C. players
Histon F.C. players
English Football League players
National League (English football) players
English football managers
Histon F.C. managers
National League (English football) managers
Millwall F.C. non-playing staff
Cardiff City F.C. non-playing staff
Gillingham F.C. non-playing staff
FA Cup Final players